Ricky G. Adams is a retired American police officer and retired soldier with the Army National Guard from the state of Oklahoma. Adams served as the Director of the Oklahoma State Bureau of Investigation, being appointment to the post by OSBI Commission effective July 1, 2018. OSBI Director Ricky Adams has been a law enforcement professional for over 42 years. He began his career at the municipal level with the Elk City and Edmond Police Departments from 1980-1986, before joining the ranks of the Oklahoma Highway Patrol.  Adams was the honor graduate of the 42nd OHP Academy in 1986.  He then continued a 32-year career, serving at every level within the Highway Patrol to include 31 months as the Assistant Commissioner for the Oklahoma Department of Public Safety. He was selected as the 26th Chief of the Oklahoma Highway Patrol in 2013 and served Oklahoma in that position until his subsequent appointment as Deputy Director for the OSBI in February 2018. He has commanded patrol operations during many large-scale manhunts and Oklahoma’s natural disasters and was one of the first responders to the 1995 Oklahoma City bombing. He has received numerous law enforcement awards for his criminal interdiction efforts.  In 2015, he was honored by induction into the Elk City Oklahoma Leadership Hall of Fame.

Major General (retired) Adams is a combat veteran who retired in 2014 after 35 years of service in the Army National Guard. Among his previous executive level military assignments are: Deputy Commanding General National Guard, US Army Training and Doctrine Command, Fort Eustis, Virginia; Assistant Adjutant General – Oklahoma ARNG; Deputy Commanding General - ARNG, Field Artillery Center, Fort Sill; Director-Police Reform Directorate, Kabul, Afghanistan; Deputy Assistant Commandant, United States Army Field Artillery School, Fort Sill; Commander of the 45th Field Artillery Brigade; and Commander of the 1BN 171st FA MLRS - Oklahoma ARNG. He has received the Army Distinguished Service Medal, Legion of Merit-twice, and the Bronze Star Medal to name a few and was inducted into the Oklahoma National Guard's Officer Candidate School (OCS) Hall of Fame in 2014. During his military career Adams served on several national level committees to include the Army Reserve Forces Policy Committee, as Chairman of the Field Artillery Advisor Council, and on the Army Chief of Staff's Readiness Committee in 2000.

Adams holds a Master of Strategic Studies Degree from the US Army War College and a Bachelor of Science from the University of Central Oklahoma. He is a 2001 graduate of the FBI National Academy and a 2016 graduate of the FBI National Executive Institute. He is also a graduate of the CAPSTONE Program at the National Defense University; National Security Management Course at Syracuse University; JTF Commander Course; Harvard University's Black Sea Security Program, and General and Flag Officer Homeland Security Executive Seminar, to name a few.

Adams is a member of the International Association of Chiefs of Police (IACP), the Association of State Criminal Investigative Agencies (ASCIA) and was the former Southern Region Chairman for the State & Provincial Police (S&P) Section. He is also a current member of the VFW, and American Legion of Edmond and has served on numerous state and national boards and advisory groups over the years.

Career

Personal life

References
https://www.dvidshub.net/news/7158/oklahoma-highway-patrolman-guides-police-reform-directorate-afghanistan

Colonel Rick Adams, Police Reform Directorate: Overview—Current Operations and Strategic. Initiatives (Kabul: Combined Security Transition Command—Afghanistan, 2006)

External links
Oklahoma State Bureau of Investigation
Oklahoma Highway Patrol official website
Major General Ricky G. Adams

Heads of Oklahoma state agencies
Living people
American state police officers
American police chiefs
United States Army generals
National Guard (United States) generals
United States Army personnel of the War in Afghanistan (2001–2021)
People from Edmond, Oklahoma
Year of birth missing (living people)